The Washington Gate, or Washington Memorial Gate, is a Milford pink granite gate installed at Cambridge Common in Cambridge, Massachusetts, United States. Each of the walls extending from the gate has a bronze tablet. It was presented by the Daughters of the American Revolution and dedicated on October 19, 1906.

References

External links
 

1906 establishments in Massachusetts
1906 sculptures
Bronze sculptures in Massachusetts
Buildings and structures completed in 1906
Buildings and structures in Cambridge, Massachusetts
Gates in the United States
George Washington
Granite sculptures in Massachusetts
Monuments and memorials in Massachusetts
Outdoor sculptures in Cambridge, Massachusetts